Béla Virág (born 12 April 1976 in Marcali) is a Hungarian football player who last plays for FC Sachsen Leipzig.

Honours 
 Hungarian League: winner 2004–05, 2005–06, 2006–07
Hungarian Cup: Runner-up 2007

External links 
European football clubs & squads
HLSZ
soccerterminal.com 
 

1976 births
Living people
People from Marcali
Hungarian footballers
Hungarian expatriate footballers
Expatriate footballers in Germany
Expatriate footballers in Austria
Debreceni VSC players
FC Sachsen Leipzig players
Association football midfielders
Sportspeople from Somogy County